Still Run is a  tributary of the Maurice River in southwestern New Jersey in the United States.

See also
List of rivers of New Jersey

References

Rivers of New Jersey
Tributaries of the Maurice River